Summer Camp Nightmare is an American 1987 thriller film directed by Bert L. Dragin and starring Chuck Connors and Charlie Stratton. The film is based on the novel The Butterfly Revolution by William Butler.

Plot

Donald Poultry is a young, intelligent but somewhat socially stunted middle school boy attending Camp North Pines for the summer along with other middle and high school kids. Riding the bus to the camp, he talks into his tape recorder diary, voicing his concerns. All goes well upon arrival; the kids unpack and are given time to play outside before the introductory camp dinner. Donald is caught by a counselor-in-training and bully, Stanley Runk, whose friends call him Runk The Punk. Runk tells Donald it is time for cabin cleaning, but becomes interested in Donald's tape recorder. Donald fools him into thinking it is a computer that analyzes him in an insulting way, and Donald strikes up an immediate enmity with Runk, only to be saved by another CIT, Chris Wade, who dismisses Runk.

At the dinner shortly afterwards, everyone says hello to the returning counselors Ed Heinz and Jack Caldwell, and Ed leads them in a welcoming applause for the new camp director Mr. Warren. Some of the boys recognize him as an old principal from their school and grumble about how strict his ruling of the camp will probably be. Mr. Warren is a middle-aged man with a generally pleasant demeanor, but he is overbearing when it comes to authority, striving to keep things "appropriate" for everyone. He is quite restrained, having limited the rec hall television to only receiving broadcasts from a religious channel, and warning everyone away from a dangerous rope bridge that leads to South Pines, the girls' side of the camp.

Mr. Warren invites some of the younger group to a butterfly hunt, revealing that collecting and studying butterflies is his hobby and specialty. Some of the older boys jeer at him behind his back, calling him "fruity,” except for Franklin Reilly, the CIT of the younger group, who seems respecting of his presence and protective of the young children like Chris.

Some of the older boys sneak off to the bridge after the dinner is over, and Franklin climbs the open-rope loop from start to finish, but they are all caught and reprimanded by Ed. Ed reminds them that summer camp is a place to have fun, not charge headfirst into danger. They all head back to the main camp in time for the evening swim. Chris tries teaching Donald how to swim, but is interrupted by a visiting female doctor who introduces herself, much to the approval of the campers. Continuing on his own, Donald accidentally floats out too far and begins to drown, but the counselors do not notice. Franklin looks up from his reading to see Donald in trouble. Surprised, he glances around to see that nobody else is responding, and jumps in to save Donald himself. When the counselors hear the frantic splashing, they reach the boys as they come out of the water. When Jack asks Franklin what happened, Franklin responds angrily that he is just doing their job for them.

Later, Franklin finds a shy boy named Peter in the cabin by himself. He asks if Peter is okay, Peter responds that he became scared when Mr. Warren kept lifting him up too high to see some of the butterflies on the hunt. When Runk enters, Franklin implies that Mr. Warren did something inappropriate to Peter, causing Runk to become furious. Franklin convinces Runk to let him take care of the problem on his own.

Later, when the boys are bored in the rec hall, Donald and Chris climb up to the roof to fix the rigging on the satellite dish and unlock the disabled channels. Mr. Warren comes in to see the boys all cheering over a music video featuring half-naked women, and he furiously locks down the rec hall. The next night, during a co-ed talent show in which the girls from South Pines visit, he further angers the boys by ending the event early in response to an inappropriate song contributed by Runk and John Mason, and as punishment, he also cancels the upcoming co-ed dance.

Some of the boys meet that night, including all of the CITs with the exception of Chris, who has been sent to the "meditation center" as punishment for making out with one of the girls after the show. Franklin leads the group in a discussion about how Mr. Warren is ruining their summer, and he proposes staging a coup and shutting away the authority to take control of the camp themselves. When some of the boys appear apprehensive, Franklin assures them it will be like a game, not serious, and Donald helps by relating the "game" to capture the flag. Franklin, impressed with Donald, appoints him to the position of captain in the upcoming revolution. Stunned, but easily won over, Donald accepts. Afterwards, the other boys are more easily sold.

The next morning, Franklin gets up early and steals a gun the counselors keep locked away for protection. The day begins as an event called Camper-Counselor Turnabout, where the campers and counselors trade places. Everyone is having fun that morning, even counselor Jack, who usually finds it difficult to get along with some of the younger group due to his heavy-duty fitness regimens. At breakfast, camper Shawn poses as Mr. Warren and with his fake authority, he lists several joking changes to the rules that everyone agrees with enthusiastically. However, he is interrupted by a suggestion from Franklin to free Chris from the meditation center, and the suggestion becomes a demanding chant from more than half of the mess hall, startling the counselors.

Franklin and his group quickly run out the back door, pursued by the counselors, who chase them to the meditation center. Though Mr. Warren appears to have the upper hand initially, when he tries to lock Franklin in the building, Franklin takes control by revealing the gun he stole. The other boys help him get the counselors into the meditation center, changing its name to the "pen,” and they pull a bewildered Chris out. Chris tries to convince Franklin not to go any farther, but Franklin replies that he has simply made a citizen's arrest. He further states that the "game" will only last for twenty-four hours. Paul and Runk stay behind to board up the pen while the other boys run off to begin the revolution. While Franklin and Runk visit the girls' camp to capture the female counselors and take over there as well, the rest of the group take over the main office and disable the phone lines. Donald helps Franklin wire the office's intercom into South Pines, and Franklin announces to the girls what has happened.

All the boys and girls gather in front of the rec hall of North Pines, and Franklin explains to everyone that it is time for the campers to have a say in how the camp is run. He appoints some of the boys and girls to ranks and positions, giving them control over certain aspects of the new combined camp. He leads everyone in an oath to the revolution, where the campers all swear not to betray the leaders.

That night, a party breaks out in the rec hall, including even the little kids, some of which drink the spiked punch. Chris and his new girlfriend Heather become shocked at how out of control things are, and they carry off the younger kids and put them to bed. Things get worse when John and Runk drag Mr. Warren out of the pen and into the party to see how he will react to it. Everyone laughs to see him with his mouth taped and his hands tied behind his back. He becomes uncomfortable when one of the drunk girls begins dancing sexily in front of him, but Chris runs back in and stops them. He takes the tape off Mr. Warren and tries to free him, but the other boys take charge again and Franklin pulls Chris outside to have a talk.

Runk leads Mr. Warren back toward the pen, but Mr. Warren starts to struggle. He shows surprising physical strength, twisting away from Runk multiple times and bashing him furiously even with his hands tied. Runk pulls out a knife and threatens Mr. Warren, but Mr. Warren charges Runk and runs right into the knife. Runk becomes shocked as Mr. Warren falls dead to the ground. He runs back over to the main office where Franklin is sitting, and blubbering, he tells Franklin what happened. Franklin almost loses control at the news, but then he pulls himself together and orders Runk to take Mr. Warren out to the caves far behind the camp and leave him in there. He warns Runk to keep the incident a secret and do exactly as he says from now on.

The next morning, Franklin announces to the camp that the revolution will continue, and he emphasizes that campers who show courage and dedication to the revolution will be named officers. He also promotes Donald to Minister of Propaganda and appoints him to the Supreme Revolutionary Committee. He goes on to name Chris Wade and Heather Long as traitors, and orders everyone to shun them. He warns that anyone seen associating with them will also be named traitors. When Chris and Heather venture out into the main camp that morning, they are stunned to see everyone running away from them. When Donald nervously refuses interaction with them, Chris realizes the situation is worse than he thought, and he and Heather run off. A girl named Laurie then asks Donald out to the rescheduled dance that will be held that night, and he accepts, but tells her he does not know how to dance. She offers to teach him, and they happily feed the camp animals together.

That night before the dance, some of the campers start a bonfire with Mr. Warren's wooden butterfly collection post outside the rec hall. People laugh at it on their way in. Laurie stands with some of her friends, telling them enthusiastically about Donald, and the girls gush when he arrives to dance with her. John leaves the dance with Debbie to go on a walk with her, but he becomes grabby and she tries to leave him. He angrily pushes her to the ground and sexually assaults her, drawing the attention of Donald and Laurie, who are also out walking, and they run to help. They report John to Franklin, and Franklin holds a meeting the next morning with the members of the Supreme Revolutionary Committee, John's friends, and Debbie's. Donald and Laurie attend as well to support her. Treating the matter like a judge in a court case, Franklin demands John tell him the truth, and John claims Debbie went along with the whole thing and is just a dirty little tease. Franklin asks Debbie what she thinks John's punishment should be, and she claims she wants him dead. The meeting erupts into a confused discussion, but Franklin controls everyone and says he will consider this while John sits out in the pen.

Later, Franklin decides to force John to traverse the rope bridge in a "trial by ordeal" arrangement, mimicking older societies who punished criminals by making them perform dangerous tasks that could kill them. When John successfully loops the whole bridge, the girls become angry at him. They wait for the other guys to leave, and then they carry John off and hang him from a tree.

Donald finds John's body and becomes very upset, deciding things have gone far enough. He jerry rigs the disabled phone lines into the satellite over the main office, using a stolen receiver as a radio. He tries to call through to someone, but only hears static, and he is captured by Officer Blackridge and locked inside the office. Chris visits him and they talk about how the camp has gone nuts, but Blackridge finds Chris and throws him out. The next morning, the camp becomes shocked to learn that Donald will be forced to loop the bridge as well, and some of them begin to realize how dangerous Franklin is. They begin to rally support amongst themselves as the crowd gathers by the bridge in time for Donald's punishment. At first it looks like he might make it, but then Franklin orders Runk to cut one of the ropes on the bridge. The campers realize Franklin wants Donald dead, and they all snap and turn against the Supreme Revolutionary Committee, fighting them off to save Donald.

The police arrive suddenly, breaking up the fight, revealing they received Donald's broadcast the previous night. They take Donald's tape recorded diary for evidence, and Donald and Chris are dismissed as unwilling participants. Franklin and Runk are taken into custody by the police. Heather and Laurie wait together by the bus for home, and are both relieved to see Chris and Donald arrive. They all board together, and the bus roars off, leaving the camp deserted.

Cast

Chuck Connors as Mr. Warren
Samantha Newark as Debbie
Charlie Stratton as Franklin Reilly
Harold Pruett as Chris Wade 
Adam Carl as Donald Poultry
Tom Fridley as John Mason
Melissa Brennan as Heather 
Stuart Rogers as Stanley Runk
Shirley Mitchell as Mrs. Knute

Release
Summer Camp Nightmare was given a limited release theatrically in the United States by Concorde Pictures through April and May 1987.

The film was released on VHS and LaserDisc the same year by Embassy Home Entertainment. As of 2021, the film has still not been officially released on DVD.

References

External links
  
 

1987 films
1987 horror films
1987 thriller films
1987 independent films
1980s teen horror films
1980s English-language films
Films based on American novels
Films about rape
Films about summer camps
American teen horror films
1987 directorial debut films
American thriller films
1980s American films